Dynasty (season 1) may refer to:

 Dynasty (1981 TV series, season 1)
 Dynasty (2017 TV series, season 1)